Jana Schadrack (born 27 December 1981) is a German former footballer who played as a forward. She made one appearance for the Germany national team in 2002.

References

External links
 

1981 births
Living people
German women's footballers
Women's association football forwards
Germany women's international footballers
Place of birth missing (living people)